Gao Gongzhi (486–527 CE) was a political figure in the Northern Wei Dynasty with the courtesy name of Daomu. He was from Bohai Commandery.

History
Gao Gongzhi was the son of Gao Chong and the younger brother of Gao Qianzhi. During the period of Xiping, he served as a censor. Gao Gongzhi had reported on Li Shizhe, the prefect of Xiangzhou. During the Zhengguang era, he obtained the qualification to be invited by the court, and later served as Taiwei Kaicao and Xiao Baoyin's  Tailangzhong. During the Xiaochang years, Li Shizhe's younger brother Li Shengui became the favored minister of Empress Hu and framed Gao Gongzhi's older brother Gao Qianzhi.

After Emperor Xiaozhuang of Wei ascended the throne, Gao Gongzhi served as Shangshu Sangong, General Ning Shuo and Shibu Langzhong, and was named Longcheng Marquis, and later served as Taishe Zhangshi, and was appointed Duke of Anxi County. After Yuan Hao was eliminated, Gao Gongzhi served as General Zhengnan, Jinzi Guanglu, Lieutenant of the Imperial Censor and Huangmen. After Erzhu Rong's death, Gao Gongzhi added the titles of General Wei, acting General of Chariots and Cavalry, Grand Governor, and concurrently served as Shangshu Youpushe, Daxingtai of Nandao, and soon as Cavalry General. In the third year of Yong'an (530), Erzhu Shilong attacked Luoyang, and Gao Gong once repelled Erzhu Shilong. Soon after Erzhu Zhao invaded Luoyang, Gao Gongzhi resigned. Shortly thereafter, Gao Gongzhi was killed by Erzhu Shilong. During the Taichang years, the court posthumously named him the Provincial Governor of Yongzhou.

References

6th-century Chinese people
6th-century Chinese military personnel
6th-century Chinese astronomers
6th-century Chinese historians
6th-century Chinese writers
Northern Wei people
Xiongnu